Harald Johansen (9 October 1887 – 11 July 1965) was a Norwegian football player. He was born in Fredrikstad. He played for the club Mercantile, and for the Norwegian national team. He competed at the 1912 Summer Olympics in Stockholm. He was Norwegian champion with the club Mercantile in 1907 and 1912.

References

External links

1887 births
1965 deaths
Sportspeople from Fredrikstad
Norwegian footballers
Norway international footballers
Footballers at the 1912 Summer Olympics
Olympic footballers of Norway
Association football midfielders